Bjarne Angell (27 April 1888 – 12 December 1938) was a Norwegian tennis player. He competed in the men's outdoor doubles' event at the 1912 Summer Olympics.

References

1888 births
1938 deaths
Norwegian male tennis players
Olympic tennis players of Norway
Tennis players at the 1912 Summer Olympics
Sportspeople from Oslo